Senator Vargas may refer to:

Rafael Rodríguez Vargas, Senate of Puerto Rico
Tony Vargas (born 1984), Nebraska State Senate